Chamonix-Aiguille-du-Midi station is a railway station in the commune of Chamonix-Mont-Blanc, in the French department of Haute-Savoie. It is located on the  gauge Saint-Gervais–Vallorcine line of SNCF.

Services 
 the following services stop at Chamonix-Aiguille-du-Midi:

References

External links 
 
 

Railway stations in Haute-Savoie